Hi viz may refer to:

 High-visibility clothing
 Hi Viz (album), by The Presets, 2018
 Hi Viz, a precision railroading system
 HI VIZ® fiber optic sight on the Smith & Wesson Model 500 revolver